"Get to You" is a song recorded by American country music singer Michael Ray. It was released on July 24, 2017 as the lead-off single from Ray's second studio album, Amos.

Content
Written by Abe Stoklasa and Pavel Dovgalyuk, "Get to You" is described as a song with a "moody melody" that Ray "passionately sings to a woman whose past heartbreak has her running away from love, pleading that he won't cause that same heartache with a message that embodies compassion."

Commercial performance
The song has sold 121,000 copies in the United States as of June 2018.

Chart performance

Weekly charts

Year-end charts

Certifications

References

2017 singles
2017 songs
Country ballads
2010s ballads
Michael Ray (singer) songs
Song recordings produced by Scott Hendricks
Atlantic Records singles
Warner Records Nashville singles